Bog Creek is a stream in Apache County of northeastern Arizona. It is a tributary to the North Fork White River.

The stream source area is on the Mogollon Rim east of Bog Butte and west of Cinder Pit Mountain at elevation . The stream flows west to southwest crossing Arizona Route 260 and then flows over the Rim to its confluence with the North Fork just below the Rim.

Bog Creek was so named on account of its boggy character after heavy rain.

See also
 List of rivers of Arizona

References

Rivers of Apache County, Arizona
Rivers of Arizona
Rivers of the Mogollon Rim